Following is a list of dams and reservoirs in South Dakota.

All major dams are linked below.

Dams and reservoirs in South Dakota 

This list is incomplete.  You can help Wikipedia by expanding it.

 Angostura Dam, Angostura Reservoir, United States Bureau of Reclamation
 Belle Fourche Dam, Belle Fourche Reservoir, USBR
 Big Bend Dam, Lake Sharpe, United States Army Corps of Engineers
 Big Stone Lake Dam, Big Stone Lake, State of Minnesota (on the South Dakota - Minnesota border)
 Cold Brook Dam, Cold Brook Lake, USACE
 Cottonwood Springs Dam, Cottonwood Springs Lake, USACE
 Deerfield Dam, Deerfield Reservoir, USBR
 Fort Randall Dam, Lake Francis Case, USACE
 Gavins Point Dam, Lewis and Clark Lake, USACE (on the South Dakota - Nebraska border)
 Oahe Dam, Lake Oahe, USACE (extends into North Dakota)
 Oglala Dam, Oglala Lake, Oglala Sioux Tribe
 Pactola Dam, Pactola Lake, USBR
 Shadehill Dam, Shadehill Reservoir, USBR
 Slater Dam, (east of CR 17, Pennington County)
 Squaw Humper Dam
 Sheridan Dam, Sheridan Lake, United States Forest Service
 Reservation Dam and White Rock Dam, Lake Traverse, USACE

See also
List of lakes in South Dakota

References 

South Dakota
Dams
Dams